Tore Torgersen (born 10 September 1968) was one of the world's leading ten-pin bowlers. He is born in Stavanger, Norway but lives in Sweden.

Tore started to bowl in 1980.

Tore has bowled in the prestigious Weber Cup on three occasions and won two of those events.

Tore is a member of the bowling team BK Skrufscha / Sweden and Trondheim BK / Norway.

Torgersen has stated that the highlight of his career was becoming world champion in UAE.  He also won the Bowling World Cup in Hermosillo, Mexico in 1994.

In 2002 Torgersen thrilled a capacity crowd to become the first double champion of the Hasseröder World Tenpin Masters. In 2006, he became a three time World Tenpin Masters champion.

He was a member of the PBA (Professional Bowlers Association) earlier but he now runs a proshop and rarely plays outside of Scandinavia unless there's a major championship.

As a 50-year old, Torgersen won the 2019 Suncoast PBA Senior U.S. Open, a major event on the PBA50 Tour, defeating top qualifier Mika Koivuniemi of Finland in an all-Scandinavia final. No longer a PBA member, Torgerson was not credited with a PBA50 title.

References

External links
Tore Torgersen's personal website
Tore Torgersen clips
 Industry profile of Tore Torgersen

Torgerson
Living people
1968 births
Sportspeople from Stavanger